Live at Home is a live concert DVD released in 2002 filmed in Nickelback's home province of Alberta, Canada during the tour supporting their album Silver Side Up.  The concert was in Edmonton on January 25, 2002, at Skyreach Centre. The concert contained an audience of 25,000 people, the greatest number of people to ever attend the arena. Near the end of the show Jerry Cantrell, joined the group to perform the song "It Ain't Like That".  During the encore, the band performs an acoustic version of the song "Mistake", a cover of Big Wreck.

Live at Home was certified Gold by the RIAA and 2× Platinum by the CRIA.

Track listing
All songs have since been re-released as b-sides to various singles except for Hollywood, Hangnail, Where Do I Hide and It Ain't Like That.

"Woke Up This Morning"
"One Last Run"
"Too Bad"
"Breathe"
"Hollywood"
"Hangnail"
"Worthy to Say"
"Never Again"
"Old Enough"
"Where Do I Hide"
"It Ain't Like That" (Alice in Chains cover) (featuring Jerry Cantrell of Alice in Chains)
"Leader of Men"
"Mistake"
"How You Remind Me"

Additional footage
 The music videos for "How You Remind Me", "Too Bad" and "Leader Of Men".
 The rare documentary The Making Of "Too Bad" - The video.
 Multi-Angle features that allow to watch each individual band member.
 Behind the scenes filming of the concert from the viewpoint of the director.
 Backstage footage before and after the show, along with interviews and on-the-road footage.

Three #1's + The First One Live

Three #1's + The First One Live is a rare live EP by Nickelback. The EP was recorded live in Nickelback's home province of Alberta, Canada during the tour supporting their album Silver Side Up. The concert was in Edmonton on January 25, 2002, at Skyreach Centre. The concert contained an audience of 25,000 people, the greatest number of people to ever attend the arena. The EP was also in promotion for the bands home video Live at Home.

Track listing
"How You Remind Me"
"Too Bad"
"Never Again"
"Leader of Men"

Personnel
Nickelback
Chad Kroeger — lead vocals, lead guitar 
Ryan Peake — rhythm guitar, backing vocals 
Mike Kroeger — bass, backing vocals
Ryan Vikedal — drums

External links 
 

Nickelback video albums
2002 video albums
2000s English-language films